Kazoops! is a British-Australian-Malaysian computer-animated comedy streaming children's television series on Netflix. The premise revolves around six-year-old Monty Kazoops, a boy with a vivid imagination, and his best friend Jimmy Jones, the family pet pig. In each episode, Monty confronts a preconception about life and sets out to challenge it with a wild imaginary adventure that offers them a new perspective.

The full season of Kazoops! consisting of 13 episodes was released on September 2, 2016.

Voice cast
 Reece Pockney as Monty, a 6-year-old boy. He has youthful enthusiasm and curiosity at every turn.
 Scott Langley as Jimmy Jones, Monty's family pet pig and best friend.
 Alex Babic as Stan, Monty’s father.
 Gemma Harvey and Teresa Gallagher as Violet, Monty’s mother.
 Jessica Hann as Jeanie, Monty’s older sister.
 Emma Tate (Series 1) and Shelley Longworth (Series 2-3) as Gran.
 Samantha, Elke, Willow and Finn Langley provide additional voices for the series.

Release
Kazoops! was released on September 2, 2016 on Netflix streaming.

References

External links
 
 
Kazoops! on Giggle Garage

2010s Australian animated television series
2010s British animated comedy television series
2010s Malaysian television series
2016 Australian television series debuts
2016 British television series debuts
2016 Malaysian television series debuts
2010s preschool education television series
Australian computer-animated television series
Australian children's animated comedy television series
Australian preschool education television series
British computer-animated television series
British children's animated comedy television series
British preschool education television series
Malaysian children's animated comedy television series
Animated preschool education television series
English-language Netflix original programming
Netflix children's programming
BBC children's television shows
CBeebies
Australian Broadcasting Corporation original programming
Animated television series about children
Animated television series about pigs
Animated television series about families
Animated television series by Netflix